Pete, Zanzibar is a village in Tanzania.

References

Villages in Zanzibar